Arthur Legrand (28 October 1833 – 8 May 1916) was a French lawyer, public servant and politician who represented Manche in the legislature almost continuously from 1871 to his death in 1916.
His political beliefs were Bonapartist and conservative at first, and later he ran as an independent..

Early life
Arthur Marie Alexis Legrand was born on 28 October 1833 in Paris. 
His parents were Baptiste Victor Alexis Legrand(fr) (1791–1848) and Marie Françoise Anasthasie de Roux (1807–1859). His father was deputy for Mortain, Manche, under the July Monarchy from 1832 to 1848.

Career
Arthur Legrand qualified as a lawyer, and was accepted as an auditor at the Conseil d'État.
He was attached to the public works section, which his father had presided over, and became secretary of many committees include those on the merchant marine, the sliding scale, the rural code, credit institutions and mining legislation.

Legrand married Thérèse Charlotte Gamot (1841-1899)  on 10 November 1860 in Toulon. Their children were Elisabeth (1861-1946), Alexis (1862-1864) and Emmanuel Marie Arthur (1873-1954).

In 1862 he led a mission to England on  the occasion of the 1862 International Exhibition, and on his return was decorated with the Legion of Honour. In 1865 and 1866 as attaché to the Superior Council of Commerce he contributed to the great inquiry into the circulation of cash and credit.

In 1866 Legrand was elected to the General Council of Manche for the canton of Barenton. He represented Barenton until 1907. Also in 1866 he was appointed maître des requêtes. He was mayor of Milly, Manche, from 1867 to 1916. After Léon Gambetta dissolved the departmental general councils on 26 December 1870 Legrand and Napoléon, comte Daru, protested the measure.

National Assembly
On 8 February 1871 Legrand was elected representative of Manche in the National Assembly.
He was one of the ten original founders of the Appel au peuple parliamentary group. He was appointed to committees on railways, canals, markets, the Bank of France and the Sacré Cœur of Montmartre, for which he submitted a draft that became law. He submitted many legal proposals concerning primary education, the merchant navy, gendarmes, distillers and a Postal Savings Bank.

He voted for the repeal of the laws of exile, for the bishops' petition, against the three-year military service, for the resignation of Adolphe Thiers, for the decree against civil burials, for the seven-year presidential term, against the amendment proposed by Henri-Alexandre Wallon, against the constitutional laws and for the law on higher education. His term ended on 7 March 1876.

Chamber of Deputies
Legrand was elected to the Chamber of Deputies for the Mortain district of Manche of 20 February 1876 by 9,898 votes to 3,904 for his republican opponent. He resumed his place with the Bonapartist right, and supported the cabinet in the 16 May 1877 crisis. After the Chamber was dissolved he was reelected on 14 October 1877. He voted for the January 1878 proposal of Philippe Touchard(fr) and for the republican ministries that followed. He was reelected on 21 August 1881.

He fought the education laws and the colonial and financial policies of the opportunistic ministries. He declined to run for election in 1885 because he could not agree with the other candidates on the  list. His term ended on 14 October 1885.

Legrand was again elected deputy of Manche on 22 September 1889 and was reelected on 20 August 1893, 8 May 1898, 27 April 1902, 6 May 1906, 24 April 1910 and 26 April 1914.
On each occasion he was returned to office by a large majority. From his various professions of belief he was clearly attached to freedom of education and the rights of the bouilleurs de cru (producers of eau de vie).
He was concerned that France would lose the Christian religion, and was worried by the growing danger of socialism.
He advocated election of the President of the Republic by universal suffrage. He was involved in many committees and participated in numerous debates.

Death
Arthur Legrand died on 8 May 1916 in Paris.
He was buried in Père Lachaise Cemetery.
He was an Officer of the Académie française and a member of the Société d'Economie politique.

Publications
Legrand contributed to the Revue Contemporaine, Economiste français and Revue Britannique.
Various speeches, reports and propositions that he made as a deputy were published. 
Other publications included:

Notes

Sources

1833 births
1916 deaths
Politicians from Paris
Appel au peuple
Members of the National Assembly (1871)
Members of the 1st Chamber of Deputies of the French Third Republic
Members of the 2nd Chamber of Deputies of the French Third Republic
Members of the 3rd Chamber of Deputies of the French Third Republic
Members of the 5th Chamber of Deputies of the French Third Republic
Members of the 6th Chamber of Deputies of the French Third Republic
Members of the 7th Chamber of Deputies of the French Third Republic
Members of the 8th Chamber of Deputies of the French Third Republic
Members of the 9th Chamber of Deputies of the French Third Republic
Members of the 10th Chamber of Deputies of the French Third Republic
Members of the 11th Chamber of Deputies of the French Third Republic